This is a list of Swedish television related events from 1966.

Events
29 January - Lill Lindfors and Svante Thuresson are selected to represent Sweden at the 1966 Eurovision Song Contest with their song "Nygammal vals". They are selected to be the eighth Swedish Eurovision entry during Melodifestivalen 1966 held in Stockholm.

Debuts

Television shows

1960s
Hylands hörna (1962-1983)

Ending this year

Births

Deaths

See also
1966 in Sweden